Business Courts, sometimes referred to as Commercial Courts, are trial courts that hear business disputes primarily or exclusively. The modern creation of specialized Business Courts in the United States began in the early 1990s, and has expanded greatly in the last twenty-five years. Business courts (or more accurately business programs or divisions within existing trial level courts) are operating in New York City and 10 other jurisdictions throughout New York State as the New York Supreme Court Commercial Division, most recently adding the Bronx Commercial Division, Chicago, North Carolina, New Jersey, Philadelphia and Pittsburgh, Pennsylvania, Reno and Las Vegas, Nevada, Massachusetts, Rhode Island, Maryland, Orlando, Miami, Ft. Lauderdale, and Tampa, Florida, Michigan, Cleveland and Toledo, Ohio, Iowa, Maine, New Hampshire, Atlanta and Gwinnett County, Georgia, Delaware's Superior Court and Court of Chancery, Nashville, Tennessee, Wisconsin, Indiana, Arizona, Kentucky and South Carolina. This map shows states having business courts either statewide, in multiple counties or cities, or within a single major city or county, which is accurate through May 2019. In February 2019, through legislation, Wyoming created the Court of Chancery of the State of Wyoming. In May 2019, Georgia's Governor signed a statute into law creating a new statewide business court in Georgia,. that became operational in 2021. In New York, Chicago, Philadelphia, Massachusetts, North Carolina, South Carolina and New Jersey, among other states with business courts, the original programs have expanded by adding judges and/or by expanding into additional cities and counties.

Delaware's Court of Chancery, the pre-eminent court addressing intra-business disputes, has functioned as a business court of limited jurisdiction for a century.  However, its traditional equity jurisdiction has evolved and expanded since 2003 to include technology disputes (10 Del. C. § 346), some purely monetary commercial disputes (10 Del. C. § 347), and to expand its role in the alternative dispute resolution of business and commercial disputes. This includes the use of mediation (10 Del. C. § 347), Masters in Chancery to adjudicate matters (10 Del. C. § 350), and agreements to make decisions non-appealable (10 Del. C. § 351).

The significant relationship between business courts and Alternative Dispute Resolution, such as mediation, neutral valuation, and arbitration, is well recognized.

Business and Commercial Courts exist internationally as well, including, for example, England and Wales, Toronto and Quebec, Canada,  Ireland, Scotland, Denmark, Hong Kong, Belgium, Bermuda, New South Wales and Victoria Australia, Northern Ireland, Qatar, Dubai, Spain, France, Switzerland, Tanzania, Rwanda, Lesotho, the British Virgin Islands, and Malaysia. New English language commercial courts have been created in Paris, Frankfurt, and the Netherlands and in Stuttgart | Mannheim, Germany.

The American College of Business Court Judges was established in 2005.

Business Court Jurisdiction, Technology Disputes & Cyber Courts, and Complex Litigation Courts
Business Courts are trial courts that hear business disputes primarily or exclusively.  In the United States, these courts have been established in approximately twenty-five states.  In some cases, a state legislature may choose to create a business court by statute.  In other cases, business courts have been established by judicial rule or order, at the Supreme Court or trial court level.  In virtually all cases, the jurisdiction of the court to hear certain cases is limited to disputes that are in some way related to "business" disputes, and generally fall into two categories:  (1) those courts which require that cases have an additional complexity component; and (2) those courts which establish jurisdictional parameters (i) through a defined list of case types (ii) combined with a specified minimum amount of damages in controversy, irrespective of complexity.  There are courts with mixed models as well.

In New York, for example, the Commercial Division may hear cases (1) alleging breach of contract, (2) arising under the state's business corporation law, (3) arising under the state's partnership law, (4) relating to commercial loans, negotiable instruments, letters of credit, and bank transactions, or (5) involving business torts.  The Commercial Division may not, by comparison, hear cases involving (1) landlord/tenant disputes, (2) commercial foreclosures, (3) products liability claims, or (4) claims alleging discrimination except when part of or under the terms of a contract.

Some states have established specialized courts that include technology disputes as part of their express jurisdiction.  Through legislative effort and court rule, Maryland established a Business and Technology Case Management Program.  In May 2003, Delaware expanded the Court of Chancery's jurisdiction to include technology disputes, and the mediation of other kinds of business disputes (10 Del. C. §§ 346, 347). West Virginia's Business Court Division Rule 24.09 expressly includes technology issues. The Davidson County, Tennessee Business Court Docket expressly encompasses technology and biotechnology licensing. North Carolina's Business Court jurisdiction expressly includes computer software, information technology and systems, data and data system security, biotechnology and bioscience technology. The High Court of Justice in England includes a Technology and Construction Court.

California, Connecticut, Phoenix, Arizona, Oregon, and Minnesota have created specialized courts or tracks for complex litigation that would include some business disputes within a broader jurisdiction of complex matters. Arizona also has a specialized commercial court in Phoenix.  Other states are in various stages of moving toward or away from business or complex courts, with Colorado having conducted extensive studies nearly two decades ago into the merits and potential parameters of creating a business court on a broad basis, which was not pursued, and Orlando, Florida having to move resources away from its Complex Business Litigation program into its family court, though this program was restored in October 2019,  while New Jersey expanded to a statewide business court track in 2015, after having only two counties with specialized commercial courts for 20 years, and South Carolina's Business Court went from a regional pilot program and is now a permanent statewide program.

References 

 Mitchell L. Bach & Lee Applebaum, A History of the Creation and Jurisdiction of Business Courts in the Last Decade, 60 Business Lawyer 147 (2004).
 John F. Coyle, Business Courts and Interstate Competition, 53 William & Mary Law Review 1915 (2012).
 Rochelle C. Dreyfuss, Forums of the Future: The Role of Specialized Courts in Resolving Business Disputes, 61 Brooklyn Law Review 1 (1995).
 Anne Tucker Nees, Making a Case for Business Courts: A Survey of and Proposed Framework to Evaluate Business Courts, 24 Georgia State University Law Review 477 (2007).
 Lee Applebaum, "Some Observations on Modern Business Courts and the Bar's Role in Their Development". (2009).
 Alvin Stauber, Commercial Courts: A Twenty First Century Necessity?, Judicial Studies Institute Journal 154 (2007).
 David Williams, "Technology Boom Prompts Calls for Specialized Courts". (October 2000).

External links 
 Business Court Resources, University of Maryland School of Law
 Business/Specialty Courts Resource Guide, National Center for State Courts

United States business law